Germán is a male given name in Spanish speaking countries. It is a cognate to French Germain, and is a variant of Latin Germanus.

Surname 
 Domingo Germán (born 1992), baseball player
 Esteban Germán (born 1978), Dominican professional baseball second baseman
 Franklyn Germán, relief pitcher
Javier Germán (born 1971), Spanish footballer
 Tamás Germán, Hungarian professional footballer

Given name

Art and music 
 Germán Casas, Chilean singer
 Germán Cueto, Mexican painter
 Germán Gedovius, Mexican painter
 Germán Pedro Ibáñez, Cuban musical director
 Germán Legarreta, Puerto Rican actor
 Germán Londoño, Colombian painter and sculptor
 Germán Magariños, Argentine film director and screenwriter
 Germán Robles, Mexican actor
 Germán Valdés, Mexican actor, singer, and comedian
 Germán Villar, Spanish tenor

Humanities and social sciences
Germán Arciniegas, Colombian essayist
Germán Carrera Damas, Venezuelan historian
Germán Castro Caycedo, Colombian writer and journalist
Germán Espinosa, Colombian novelist and poet
Germán Gullón, Spanish literary critic
Germán Nogueira Gómez, Cuban author

Politics
 Germán Busch, President of Bolivia from 1937 to 1939
 Germán List Arzubide, Mexican revolutionary
 Germán Martínez, Mexican politician
 Germán Riesco, President of Chile from 1901 to 1906
 Germán Ignacio Riesco Errázuriz, Chilean politician, son of the above
 Germán Sequeira, Nicaraguan politician
 Germán Serrano Pinto, Costa Rican politician
 Germán Suárez Flamerich, former president of Venezuela
 Germán Trejo, American immigrant rights activist
 Germán Vargas Lleras, Colombian politician and presidential candidate

Sport

Association football
 Germán Aceros, Colombian footballer
 Germán Alemanno, Argentine footballer
 Germán Arangio, Argentine footballer
 Germán Beltrán, Spanish footballer
 Germán Burgos, Argentine footballer
 Germán Cano, Argentine footballer
 Germán Carty, Peruvian footballer
 Germán Castillo, Argentine footballer
 Germán Chavarría, Costa Rican footballer
 Germán Denis, Argentine footballer
 Germán Herrera (footballer, born 1983), Argentine forward for Rosario Central
 Germán Herrera (footballer, born 1993), Argentine midfielder for Club Atlético Brown
 Germán Leguía, Peruvian footballer
 Germán Lauro, Argentine shotputter
 Germán Leonforte, Argentine footballer
 Germán Lux, Argentine footballer
 Germán Montoya, Argentine footballer
 Germán Pacheco, Argentine footballer
 Germán Pietrobon, Argentine footballer
 Germán Pinillos, Peruvian footballer
 Germán Ré, Argentine footballer
 Germán Rivarola, Argentine footballer
 Germán Saenz de Miera Colmeneiro, Spanish footballer
 Germán Villa, Mexican footballer
 Germán Voboril, Argentine footballer

Other sports
 Germán Barranca, Mexican baseball player in the U.S. Major League
 Germán Chiaraviglio, Argentine pole vaulter
 Germán Durán, Mexican baseball player in the U.S. Major League
 German Fernandez, American distance runner
 Germán Figueroa, Puerto Rican wrestler
 Germán Gabriel, Spanish basketball player
 Germán Garrido, Spanish golfer	
 German Glessner, Argentine skeleton racer
 Germán González, Venezuelan baseball player in the U.S. Major League
 Germán Jiménez, Mexican baseball player in the U.S. Major League
 Germán López, former Spanish professional tennis player
 Germán Martínez (swimmer), Colombian swimmer
 Germán Mesa, Cuban baseball player
 Germán Orozco, Argentine field hockey player
 Germán Ospina, Colombian cyclist
 Germán Quiroga, Mexican NASCAR Corona Series race car driver
 Germán Recio, Dominican Republic volleyball player
 Germán Rieckehoff, Puerto Rican swimmer and president of the Puerto Rican Olympic Committee
 Germán Rivera, Puerto Rican baseball player in the U.S. Major League
 Germán Sánchez (racewalker), Mexican race walker
 Germán Sánchez (racing driver), Spanish racing driver
 Germán Silva, retired Mexican long-distance runner
 Germán Torres, Mexican boxer

Other
 Germán Abad Valenzuela, Ecuadorian radiologist
 Germán Busch, Bolivian military officer
 Germán Efromovich, South American entrepreneur
 Germán Frers (disambiguation)
 Germán Garmendia, Chilean YouTube comedian
 Germán Larrea Mota-Velasco, Mexican businessman
 Germán Martínez Hidalgo, American scientist
 Germán Olano Moreno, for whom the Captain Germán Olano Moreno Air Base is named
 Germán Pinelli, Cuban journalist
 Germán Sánchez (disambiguation)
 Germán Sánchez Ruipérez, for whom the Germán Sánchez Ruipérez Foundation is named

Spanish masculine given names